The 1st Rifle Division NKVD was a division of the NKVD of the Soviet Union during World War II.

History 
The 1st Rifle Division NKVD was formed in August 1941 from the 3rd, 7th, 33rd and 102nd Border Guard Detachments and the 7th and 33rd NKVD Rifle Regiments.  In December 1941 the division was then assigned to the 8th Army where it remained until February 1942 when it moved back to the Neva Operational Group as part of the Leningrad Front.  Later that year in August the division was transferred to the Red Army and redesignated as the 46th Rifle Division.

Organization at beginning 
Organization of the "division" before it was actually considered a division sized unit.:

 Headquarters
 3rd NKVD Rifle Regiment (Former 3 Border Guards)
 7th NKVD Rifle Regiment (Former 7 NKVD Regiment)
 33rd NKVD Rifle Regiment (Former 33 NKVD Regiment)
 102nd NKVD Rifle Regiment (Former 102 Border Guards)
93rd Light Artillery Regiment (Attached during Winter War)

Organization during War 
When the war started the division was de-organized and re-organized as a rifle division within the army.  It was then known (in the army) as the "46th (Dzerzhinsky) Rifle Division): see for further information.  The structure when it entered the army:

 Headquarters
 176th Rifle Regiment
 314th Rifle Regiment
 340th Rifle Regiment
 393rd Light Artillery Regiment
 60th Separate Anti-Tank Company
49th Reconnaissance Company
40th Engineer Battalion
353rd Signal Battalion
36th Medical Battalion
63rd Separate Chemical Defense Company
138th Motor Transport Company
299th Field Bakery
68th Divisional Veterinary Hospital
937th Field Post Station
1134th Field Tick Office of the State Bank

References 

Divisions of the NKVD in World War II
Military units and formations established in 1941
Military units and formations disestablished in 1942